The GCC Champions League, is an annually organized football league tournament for club of the Arabian Peninsula.

The 2005 edition was the 21st time that it was organised and was won by Kuwaiti side Al Qadsia Kuwait for the second time.

Results

''All match were played in  Kuwait.

Top Scorer

  Alexandre Oliveira (Al Wasl FC) – 4 goals

Winner

 
 

GCC Champions League
Gulf Club Champions Cup, 2005